Tomáš Kramný (born June 8, 1973) is a Czech former professional ice hockey defenceman.

Kramný played a total of 186 games in the Czech Extraliga, playing for HC Vítkovice, HC Slezan Opava and HC Znojemští Orli. He also played in the Tipsport Liga for MsHK Žilina, the Ligue Magnus for Diables Rouges de Briançon and the Polska Hokej Liga for GKS Tychy.

References

External links

1973 births
Living people
Brest Albatros Hockey players
HSC Csíkszereda players
Czech ice hockey defencemen
Diables Rouges de Briançon players
GKS Tychy (ice hockey) players
HK Nitra players
Orli Znojmo players
HC Slezan Opava players
HC Vítkovice players
MsHK Žilina players
Czech expatriate ice hockey players in Slovakia
Czech expatriate sportspeople in France
Expatriate ice hockey players in France
Czech expatriate sportspeople in Romania
Expatriate ice hockey players in Romania
Czech expatriate sportspeople in Poland
Expatriate ice hockey players in Poland
Czech expatriate ice hockey people